Ga-Lekalakala is a large, semi-urban rural township in the Mogalakwena Local Municipality of the Capricorn District Municipality of the Limpopo province in South Africa. It is located just 6,2 km north of the town of Mokopane on the N11 road.

References

Populated places in the Mogalakwena Local Municipality